Peter John Schofield (born 12 February 1932) is a former Australian rules footballer who played for Richmond, Melbourne, and North Melbourne in the Victorian Football League (VFL) during the 1950s.

Mentone's Peter Schofield arrived on the VFL scene when he kicked four goals on debut for Richmond and finished the season with 21 goals from just six appearances. He did not, however, get many opportunities in the seniors over the next two years, nor did he at Melbourne when he crossed there in 1953.

In 1954, Schofield crossed to Moorabbin in the Victorian Football Association (VFA). He was the VFA's leading goalkicker in 1954, when he kicked 96 goals for the year, including a tally of 22 goals in a match against Sandringham. Schofield played in this stint for Moorabbin for just over three seasons, and was cleared to North Melbourne after Round 2, 1957.

At North Melbourne, Schofield was used as a full-forward and played in a losing preliminary final in 1958. He topped their goal-kicking in 1959 with 47 goals and the following season he kicked a VFL career-high eight goals in a match against South Melbourne at Arden Street.

In June 1961, Schofield was cleared back to Moorabbin for a second stint, where he and young star forward Max Papley formed a strong forward-line combination. He played a total of 75 games for Moorabbin, and kicked 312 goals.

External links

Peter Schofield's playing statistics from The VFA Project

References

1932 births
Australian rules footballers from Victoria (Australia)
Richmond Football Club players
Melbourne Football Club players
North Melbourne Football Club players
Moorabbin Football Club players
Living people
People educated at Mentone Grammar School